Veronika Munk is a Hungarian journalist and the current editor-in-chief of the news portal Telex.hu.

References 

Hungarian journalists
1979 births
Journalists from Budapest
Living people